This is a list of notable current and former faculty members, alumni, and non-graduating attendees of Indiana State University in Terre Haute, Indiana

Presidents
William Albert Jones (1869-1879)
George Pliny Brown (1879-1885)
William Wood Parsons (1885-1921), LL.D., DePauw University 
Linnaeus Neal Hines (1921-1933), M.A., Cornell University 
Ralph Noble Tirey (1934-1953),  M.A., Indiana University
Dr. Raleigh Warren Holmstedt (1953-1965), Ph.D., Columbia Teachers College, Columbia University
Dr. Alan Carson Rankin (1965-1975), D.S.Sc., Syracuse University
Dr. Richard George Landini (1975-1992), Ph.D., University of Florida
Dr. John Moore (1992-2000), Ph.D., Pennsylvania State University
Dr. Lloyd W. Benjamin III (2000-2008) Ph.D., University of North Carolina
Dr. Daniel J. Bradley (2008–2018) Ph.D., Michigan State University
Dr. Deborah J. Curtis (2018–present) Ph.D., Indiana State University

Faculty
 William Ashbrook 
 James Chesebro
 Robert Clouse 
 Jeffrey S. Harper
 Kenneth T. Henson
 Leroy Lamis, sculptor 
 Charles Nicol 
 Edward A. Pease 
 Michael Shelden, biographer
Todd Whitaker

Notable alumni

Business
 Gerry Dick, host of Inside INdiana Business
 Tony George, founder and team owner, Indy Racing League 
 Jim Lewis, President, Disney Vacation Club 
 Bill Lister, Senior VP and GM, Roche Diagnostics
 Will Weng, journalist, New York Times

Medicine
 H.R. Cox, bacteriologist, discovered Rocky Mountain spotted fever treatment and several typhus vaccines
 Jill Bolte Taylor, "The Singing Scientist", neuroanatomist, one of 2008 Time magazine's "100 Most Influential People" 
 J. Buzz Von Ornsteiner, forensic psychologist, television personality

Government

Members of Congress (13)
 Birch Bayh, US Senator, Indiana (1963–1981); authored two Constitutional amendments 
 John S. Benham, US Representative, Indiana 4th District (1919–1923) 
 Thurman C. Crook, US Representative, Indiana 3rd District (1949–1951) 
 Brad Ellsworth, US Representative, Indiana 8th District (2007–2011) 
 Clarence C. Gilhams, US Representative, Indiana 12th District (1906–1909) 
 Brian D. Kerns, US Representative, Indiana 7th District (2001–2003) 
 William Larrabee, US Representative for Indiana 6th and 11th Districts (1931–1943) 
 D. Bailey Merrill, US Representative, Indiana 8th District (1953–1955) 
 John T. Myers, US Representative, Indiana 7th District (1967–1997) 
 Edward A. Pease, US Representative, Indiana 7th District (1997–2001) 
 Everett Sanders, US Representative, Indiana 5th District (1917–1925); Secretary to President Calvin Coolidge (1925–1929); Chairman, Republican National Committee (1932–1934) 
 Albert Henry Vestal, US Representative, Indiana 8th District (1917–1932); Republican Whip (1923–1931) 
 Fred Wampler, US Representative, Indiana 6th District (1959–1961)

State political leaders
 John R. Gregg, Indiana House of Representatives, 1986–2002;  Speaker of the House 1996-2002, Majority Leader 1990-1994 
 Bob Heaton, Indiana House of Representatives, 2010–Present 
 Phillip Hinkle, Indiana House of Representatives, 2000-2012 
Cary D. Landis, Florida Attorney General, (1931–1938)
 Carolene Mays, member of Indiana Utility Regulatory Commission; former State Representative, Indiana House, 2002–2008 
 Richard M. Milburn, Indiana Attorney General, (January 1915-November 1915)
 Mike Tryon, Illinois House of Representatives, 2005-2017

Diplomats
 George Washington Buckner, Ambassador to Liberia (1913–1915) 
 Cynthia Shepard Perry (b. 1928), bachelor in political science, 1969; Ambassador to Sierra Leone (1986-1989), Burundi (1989-1993)

Judges
 Gene E. Brooks, Judge, U.S. District Court for the Southern District of Indiana, tenure 1979-1994; Chief Judge 1987–1994 
 Noma Gurich, Justice of the Oklahoma Supreme Court, State of Oklahoma 
 Allen Sharp, Senior Judge, U.S. District Court for the Northern District of Indiana, tenure 1973-2009; Chief Judge 1981–1996

Other
 Marvella Bayh, late wife of long-time Indiana Senator Birch Bayh; mother of former Indiana Senator Birch Evans Bayh III; instrumental in establishing Hoosier Girls State at Indiana State University 
 Willa Brown, African-American aerospace pioneer; first African-American woman commercial pilot in United States; first African-American female officer in Civil Air Patrol
 P. Pete Chalos, Mayor of Terre Haute, Indiana 1980-1996
 Dr. Kamlesh "Kam" Lulla, NASA, Chief Scientist for Earth Observation, Human Exploration Science Office, Johnson Space Center
 Jeff Papa, first Mayor of Zionsville, Indiana.
 Kenneth L. Peek, Jr., Lieutenant General, United States Air Force, former 8 AF Commander 
 Chuck Smith, Mayor, Woodmere, Ohio, 2009–Present

Education

Current
 
 Charles "Chuck" Johnson, President, Vincennes University (2015–present)
 Ronald L. Vaughn, President, University of Tampa (1995–present)

Former

Presidents and Chancellors 
 Max P. Allen, President, McKendree College (1960–1964)
 Isaac K. Beckes, President Vincennes University (1950–1980)
 Eugene W. Bohannon, President University of Minnesota, Duluth (1902–1937)
 Isaac M. Burgan, President Paul Quinn College (1883-1891, 1911-1914)
 Elmer Burritt Bryan, President of Colgate University (1909–1921), Ohio University (1921–1934), Franklin College
 Lotus Coffman, President of the University of Minnesota (1920–1938)
 Myron Coulter, Chancellor, Western Carolina University (1984–1994)
 Lewis C. Dowdy, sixth President and first Chancellor of North Carolina Agricultural and Technical State University (1964–1980)
 John R. Gregg, 20th President, Vincennes University (2003-2004)
 Richard E. Helton, President, Vincennes University (2004–2015)
 Martin David Jenkins, President, Morgan State University (1948–1970)
 Eldon Johnson, President, University of New Hampshire (1955–1962)
 John Edward McGilvrey, First President Kent State University (1911–1926)
 Caleb Mills, Second Indiana Superintendent of Public Instruction, (1854–1857)
 Walter P. Morgan, President Western Illinois University, (1912–1941)
 Edison E. Oberholtzer, founder and President, University of Houston (1927–1950)
 M. Victoria Schuller, OSF, President, University of Albuquerque (1966–1983)
 Lou Anna K. Simon, President, Michigan State University (2003–2018)
 Phillip Summers, President, Vincennes University (1980–2001)
 Sandra Westbrooks, Provost and Senior Vice President of Academic Affairs, Chicago State University, (2008-2013)
 Dr. Herbert Wey, President, Chancellor Appalachian State University (1969–1979)

Deans and administrators
 Birch Bayh, professor, coach, Athletic Director, Indiana State University, Director of Physical Education, 30+ years in the Terre Haute and Washington D.C. school systems
 Charlotte Schweitzer Burford, Dean of Women, Indiana State University (1910–1946)
 Grace DeVaney, first woman to serve as a high school principal in Indiana, at Terre Haute Garfield High School
 Rupert Evans, Dean, College of Education, University of Illinois
 Barton Evermann, author, educator
 Fred E. Harris, Dean and Vice President, Baldwin-Wallace College
 Robert Jerry, Dean, University of Florida, Levin College of Law (2003–present)
 James F. Kane, Dean, College of Business Administration, University of South Carolina
 William Harrison Mace, (educator, author, professor of history)
 Johnny Matson, professor; psychologist at Louisiana State University
 Andrew C. Porter, President, AERA, professor, Vanderbilt University
 Fred Albert Shannon, professor and historian, won the 1929 Pulitzer Prize (History)
 Elizabeth J. Simpson Dean, School of Family Resources and Consumer Sciences, University of Wisconsin
 Ben F. Small, Dean, Indiana University Robert H. McKinney School of Law

Athletics
 Jeff Belskus, President, Indy Eleven Soccer franchise
Nevin Ashley, Major League Baseball player
Richard Atha, professional basketball player 
Clint Barmes, San Diego Padres, Major League Baseball player 
Tim Barrett, Major League Baseball player
Bruce Baumgartner, wrestler, Olympic gold medalist, James E. Sullivan Award 
Junius “Rainey” Bibbs, professional baseball player 
Larry Bird, professional basketball player and administrator 
Jerry Blemker, Junior College baseball coach, Vincennes University 1980-2006; Leader in wins, NJCAA; 1,188 wins
Cheryl Bridges, Women's Marathon World Record Holder, Dec 1971-Dec 1973
Jim Brumfield, professional football player
Billy Clapper, Head Coach, Men's Basketball Penn State Altoona 
Roger Counsil, NCAA champion gymnastic coach; former head USA Gymnastics 
Wayne Davis, professional football player 
Brian Dorsett, Major League Baseball player 
David Doster, Major League Baseball player
 Steve Englehart, Head Coach, Presbyterian Blue Hose 
Stewart “Red” Faught, Head Coach, Football Franklin College
Mike Gardiner, Major League Baseball player
Tom Gilles, Major League Baseball player
Vencie Glenn, professional football player 
Alex Graman, Major League Baseball player 
Rick Grapenthin, Major League Baseball player 
 Robert Griswold (born 1996), swimmer
Mitch Hannahs, Head Coach, Indiana State Sycamores
Bill Hayes, Major League Baseball player & coach
John Hazen, professional basketball player 
Tunch Ilkin, professional football player 
Blaise Ilsley, Major League Baseball player
Jeff James, Major League Baseball player
Tommy John, Major League Baseball player 
Harold Johnson, professional basketball player
Wallace Johnson, Major League Baseball player 
Doug Kay, professional football coach 
Beverly Kearney, head coach, University of Texas women's track and field team 
Duane Klueh, professional basketball player, former Head Coach of men's basketball, tennis at Indiana State University 
Danny Lazar, Major League Baseball player 
Bryan Leturgez, Olympic bobsledder; Bronze Medalist - 1993 World Championships 
Sean Manaea, Major League Baseball player
Pancho Martin, professional football player
Thad Matta, Head Coach, Men's Basketball; Ohio State University 
Carl Nicks, professional basketball player 
Jake Odum, professional basketball player, European Leagues (2014–present)
Brian Omogrosso, Chicago White Sox, professional baseball player 
Jake Petricka, Major League Baseball player
Dr. Ferne E. Price, All-American Girls Professional Baseball League player; ISU alumni and coach, women's softball and swimming squads
Colin Rea, Major League Baseball player
Jerry Reynolds, professional basketball coach, general manager 
Bob Royer, professional basketball player 
Micah Shrewsberry - Head Coach Penn State Nittany Lions
Chuck Smith, Major League Baseball player
Steve Smith, silver medalist, high jump, 1995 Pan Am Games
Zane Smith, Major League Baseball player 
Dan Sparks, professional basketball player; NJCAA Champion Coach
Mitch Stetter, Kansas City Royals, Major League Baseball coach 
Ryan Strausborger, Major League Baseball player
Ryan Tatusko, professional baseball player
Joe Thatcher, Houston Astros, Major League Baseball player 
Kurt Thomas, Olympic participant, gymnastics; James E. Sullivan Award 
Robert Tonyan, National Football League player (Green Bay Packers)
Bobby Turner, Atlanta Falcons, Assistant Coach (running backs)
 Jayson Wells (born 1976) - basketball player
Paul "Billy" Williams - Athletic Director, Indiana State Muncee Hoosieroons (1921-1958)
John Wooden, college basketball player
Andy Young, Major League Baseball players (Arizona Diamondbacks)
Christopher Overton - Sports Agent (National Football League)
Robert Griswold, Paralympic swimmer

Arts, Entertainment and Media
 Michael Evans Behling, model and actor
 EST Gee, American rapper 
 Troy Brownfield, comic book writer and author
 Bubba the Love Sponge (born Todd Alan Clem), radio talk show host
 David Darling, Grammy Award-winning cellist, composer
 Ross Ford, motion picture and television personality
 Margaret Gisolo, founder, Arizona Arts Alliance
 James Brian Hellwig, The Ultimate Warrior, WWE wrestler
 Belford Hendricks, composer, pianist, arranger, conductor and record producer
 Jamal Khashoggi, B.S. Business Administration 1983; Saudi dissident, author, activist, editor, Washington Post columnist, assassinated inside Saudi Arabian Consulate in Turkey, 2 October 2018
 Margaret Hill McCarter, 1884 A.B., schoolteacher, writer, and first woman to address a Republican National Convention
 Ami McKay, a writer
 Alvy Moore, movie and television personality
 Sister Edith Pfau, S.P., painter, sculptor and art educator
 Wanda Ramey, pioneer female news anchor
 Rudy Render, music arranger/director; musician; actor; educator
 Jared Yates Sexton, author and political commentator
 Tom Trimble, 1974 Emmy Award-winning art director
 Stuart Vaughn, better known as Stuart Vaughan, Obie Award-winning director
 Al Dukes, award winning producer of the Boomer & Gio Show on WFAN in New York

Fictional alumni
 Marty Byrde, main character in Ozark played by Jason Bateman

References

Indiana State people